The Daughter is a 2021 Spanish thriller drama film directed by Manuel Martín Cuenca, which stars Javier Gutiérrez, Patricia López Arnaiz and Irene Virgüez.

Plot 
Irene is a teenage girl living in a youth detention center who has just got pregnant. She is offered to live with Javier and Adela (a couple desperate to have a child) in a remote house in the mountains in exchange for the baby.

Cast 
 Javier Gutiérrez as Javier
 Patricia López Arnaiz as Adela
 Irene Virgüez as Irene

Production 

The Daughter was written by Manuel Martín Cuenca and Alejandro Hernández based on a "horror-oriented" original story by Félix Vidal.

The score was composed and performed by Vetusta Morla.

Fully shot in the province of Jaén, filming locations included the provincial capital (Jaén) as well as the Sierras de Cazorla, Segura y Las Villas Natural Park. The fictional couple's house in the mountains was located in the so-called Llanos del Peral.

Release 
The film had its world premiere at the 46th Toronto International Film Festival (TIFF) on 13 September 2021. It also screened at the 69th San Sebastián International Film Festival later in the month. Distributed by Caramel Films, the film was theatrically released in Spain on 26 November 2021.

Reception 
Janire Zurbano of Cinemanía gave the film 3 out of 5 stars, considering that while lacking the rhythm and plot-turns of other Martín Cuenca's films such as Cannibal and The Motive, the almost theatrical mise-en-scène and the visual power of the landscapes put tension and pressure on the viewers; cornering them to identify with the protagonists.

Beatriz Martínez of Fotogramas gave the film 5 out of 5 stars, considering the film a masterpiece of contemporary Spanish cinema, a film "as shocking as it is memorable, as a macabre fable".

Raquel Hernández Luján of HobbyConsolas gave the film 60 out of 100 points, considering that—despite praising the exquisite cinematography, the composition of the shots, the score and the performances of the adults—it was a "slow, predictable and boring" film and that the child actress' performance was subpar.

Quim Casas of El Periódico de Catalunya gave the film 3 out of 5 stars, considering that the "elegant and austere" filmmaking plays well on its setting and the reduced number of characters.

Awards and nominations 

|-
| align = "center" rowspan = "3" | 2021 || rowspan = "3" | 34th ASECAN Awards || colspan = "2" | Best Film ||  || rowspan = "3" | 
|-
| Best Director || Manuel Martín Cuenca || 
|-
| Best Screenplay || Manuel Martín Cuenca, Alejandro Hernández || 
|-
| align = "center" rowspan = "12" | 2022 || 9th Feroz Awards || Best Original Score || Vetusta Morla ||  || 
|-
| rowspan = "6" | 1st Carmen Awards || Best Fiction Feature Film || La Loma Blanca PC ||  || rowspan = "6" | 
|-
| Best Direction || Manuel Martín Cuenca || 
|-
| Best Screenplay || Alejandro Hernández, Manuel Martín Cuenca || 
|-
| Best Production Supervision || Ernesto Chao || 
|-
| Best Makeup and Hairstyles || Yolanda Piña || 
|-
| Best Supporting Actor || Juan Carlos Villanueva || 
|-
| rowspan = "2" | 77th CEC Medals || Best Director || Manuel Martín Cuenca ||  || rowspan = "2" | 
|-
| Best Actor || Javier Gutiérrez || 
|-
| rowspan = "2" | 36th Goya Awards || Best Director || Manuel Martín Cuenca ||  || rowspan = "2" | 
|-
| Best Actor || Javier Gutiérrez || 
|-
| 30th Actors and Actresses Union Awards || Best Film Actor in a Leading Role || Javier Gutiérrez ||  || 
|}

See also 
 List of Spanish films of 2021

References

External links 
 The Daughter at ICAA's Catálogo de Cinespañol

2021 films
2020s Spanish-language films
Films shot in the province of Jaén (Spain)
Spanish pregnancy films
Films about surrogacy
Teenage pregnancy in film
2020s pregnancy films
Spanish thriller films
2021 thriller films
2021 drama films
MOD Producciones films
2020s Spanish films